To the Pain is the fourth album released by the rock band Nonpoint. It is their first release through independent label Bieler Bros. Records. The album was produced by guitarist Andrew Goldman.

The album debuted #147 on the Billboard 200 charts. It sold 9,000 copies in its first week. As of March 2006, the album has sold 130,000 copies.

The album's two singles, "Bullet with a Name" and "Alive and Kicking," are both used in the pro wrestling video game WWE SmackDown vs. RAW 2007.

Track listing
The final track is a hidden track, separated by sixteen 4-second blank "untitled tracks". An untitled instrumental starts at 9:22 after silence, running 6:42.  The release to all streaming services on 12/25/2019 includes the hidden track as part of "The Shortest Ending" after a 5:10 period of silence, bringing the total length of track 14 to 16:37. Four live tracks are included as bonuses.

Personnel
Nonpoint
 Elias Soriano – lead vocals
 Andrew Goldman – guitar, backing vocals, producer, mixing
 Ken MacMillan – bass, backing vocals
 Robb Rivera – drums

Additional
 Luis González – percussion
 Mike Fuller – mastering
 Matt LaPlant – engineer, mixing
 Jason Edwards – cover model

References

Nonpoint albums
2005 albums
Bieler Bros. Records albums